The statue of official Bes is to be found in the Museum of Calouste Gulbenkian in Lisbon. The height of the sculpture is 32.2 cm, the width is 20.9 cm.

The inscription on the base of this statue is “Count and Prince, Companion of His Majesty”. Bes is sitting in a position that was used frequently in the Old Kingdom (c. 2649–2150 BC), later at the beginning of the New Kingdom (c. 1550–1070 BC) and again by the officials, including this courtier, who served Psammetichus I (Wahibre) (664–610 BC).

Bes
Sculptures of ancient Egypt